The terms "Aviación Nacional" ("Nationalist Aviation"), "Fuerza Aérea Nacional" ("Nationalist Air Force") and "Ejército Nacional del Aire" ("Nationalist Army of the Air") refer to military air units supporting General Franco against the Second Spanish Republic in the Spanish Civil War and includes:
 The Nationalist side of the Spanish Air Force made up of planes supplied by Nazi Germany, Fascist Italy and by aircraft captured from the Spanish Republican Air Force
Condor Legion of Nazi Germany
Aviazione Legionaria of Fascist Italy

At the end of the war, the air force was reorganised into the current iteration of the Spanish Air Force, with its fin flash still used on modern Spanish aircraft.

History
The Aviación Nacional was formed from rebel elements of the Aeronáutica Militar and Aeronáutica Naval at the onset of the Spanish Civil War, seizing control of 90 out of 400 military and civilian aircraft in Spain. With additional aircraft and training supplied by Germany and Italy, it was quick to gain air superiority over the Spanish Republic's relatively obsolete aircraft. German aircraft flew in Spanish Nationalist colours as part of the Condor Legion, giving such aircraft as the Heinkel He-111 and the Junkers Ju-87 their first combat experience.

See also
Spanish Air Force
Condor Legion
List of Spanish Civil War air aces

References

Bibliography

 Green, William & Swanborough, Gordon. "Soviet Flies in Spanish Skies". Air Enthusiast Quarterly, No. 1, n.d., pp. 1–16.

External links

Spain – Nationalist
Spanish Air and Space Force
Spain – Nationalist
Military units and formations established in 1936
Military units and formations disestablished in 1939